Nikolai Viktorovich Osyanin (12 December 1941 – 21 March 2022) was a Soviet footballer who played as a striker.

International career
Osyanin scored on his debut for the USSR national team on 4 December 1965 in a friendly against Uruguay. He scored less than a minute after coming on as a substitute with 19 minutes to go in the game. He did not play again for the national team until 1969.

Honours
Spartak Moscow
 Soviet Top League: 1969
 Soviet Cup: 1971

External links
  Profile

1941 births
2022 deaths
People from Verkhneuslonsky District
Soviet footballers
Russian footballers
Association football forwards
Soviet Union international footballers
Soviet Top League players
FC Rubin Kazan players
PFC Krylia Sovetov Samara players
FC Spartak Moscow players
FC Kairat players
Russian expatriate footballers
Russian expatriate sportspeople in Kazakhstan
Expatriate footballers in Kazakhstan
Sportspeople from Tatarstan